Qaanaaq, formerly known as Thule or New Thule, is the main town in the northern part of the Avannaata municipality in northwestern Greenland. It is one of the northernmost towns in the world. The inhabitants of Qaanaaq speak the local Inuktun language and many also speak Kalaallisut and Danish. The town has a population of 646 as of 2020.

Geography
Qaanaaq is located in the northern entrance of the Inglefield Fjord. The village of Qeqertat is located in the Harvard Islands, near the head of the fjord.

History 

The Qaanaaq area in northern Greenland was first settled around 2000 BC by the Paleo-Eskimo migrating from the Canadian Arctic.

In 1818, Sir John Ross's expedition made first contact with nomadic Inuktun (Polar Eskimos) in the area. James Saunders's expedition aboard HMS North Star was marooned in North Star Bay 1849–50 and named landmarks. Robert Peary built a support station by a protected harbor at the foot of iconic Mount Dundas in 1892. It served as a base camp for his expeditions and attracted a permanent population. In 1910 explorers Knud Rasmussen and Peter Freuchen established a missionary and trading post there. They called the site "Thule" after classical ultima Thule; the Inuit called it Umanaq ("heart-shaped"), and the site is commonly called "Dundas" today. The United States abandoned its territorial claims in the area in 1917 in connection with the purchase of the Virgin Islands. Denmark assumed control of the village in 1937.

A cluster of huts known as Pituffik ("the place the dogs are tied") stood on the wide plain where the base was built in 1951. (A main base street was named Pituffik Boulevard.) The affected locals moved to Thule. In a Danish Supreme Court judgment of 28 November 2003 the move was considered an expropriative intervention. During the proceedings it was recognized by the Danish government that the movement was a serious interference and an unlawful act against the local population. The Thule tribe was awarded damages of 500,000 kroner, and the individual members of the tribe who had been exposed to the transfer were granted compensation of 15,000 or 25,000 each. A Danish radio station continued to operate at Dundas, and the abandoned houses remained. The USAF only used that site for about a decade, and it has since returned to civilian use.

Knud Rasmussen was the first to recognize the Pituffik plain as ideal for an airport. USAAF Colonel Bernt Balchen, who built Sondrestrom Air Base, knew Rasmussen and his idea. Balchen led a flight of two Consolidated PBY Catalina flying boats to Thule on 24 August 1942 and then sent a report advocating an air base to USAAF chief Henry "Hap" Arnold. However, the 1951 air base site is a few miles inland from the original 1946 airstrip and across the bay from the historical Thule settlement, to which it is connected by an ice road. The joint Danish-American defense area, designated by treaty, also occupies considerable inland territory in addition to the air base itself.

The town of Qaanaaq was established in the winter of 1953 when the United States expanded Thule Air Base and forcibly relocated the population of Pituffik and Dundas  to the north within four days. The settlement was subsequently moved another  to the north.

A 48.6-kilogram (107-pound) fragment of the Cape York meteorite, discovered near Thule in the summer of 1955, is named for the town.

Culture 
Ways of living so far north and in such severe climatic conditions are passed on from generation to generation, and this ability to adapt has contributed to the survival of this small settlement. When the sea becomes open sometime around August, large dinghies with powerful engines are used for both hunting trips and ordinary journeys. There is still sunlight twenty-four hours a day at this time—the midnight sun lasts from the middle of April to the end of August. Nothing from the hunt goes to waste: the skins are used for clothing and covering the kayaks; the flesh and offal are eaten by humans and domestic animals; the narwhal and walrus tusks are carved into finely-worked figures, jewellery and hunting implements; and even feathers can be used in handicrafts.

Education 
The local school, Avanersuup Atuarfia, has around 120 pupils in forms 1 to 10. There is also a boarding school which holds about 20 students from surrounding settlements. The town kindergarten has a capacity of 34 children while the day nursery can hold up to 12.

Transport 

Air Greenland operates fixed-wing aircraft services between Qaanaaq Airport and Upernavik Airport, with further connections to Ilulissat Airport and Qaarsut Airport. Settlement flights operate to Siorapaluk, sporadically to Moriusaq, and to Savissivik via Thule Air Base.

There are a few unpaved dirt roads in Qaanaaq. Only one road leaves the town - it connects to Qaanaaq Airport. Pickup trucks and SUVs are found in Qaanaaq, but skis, dogsleds and walking are better alternatives for getting around.

Medical and emergency services

There is a small hospital (built in the 1950s and rebuilt in 1996) in Qaanaaq with basic health care offered. More advanced care requires transfer to other medical centers in Greenland by air. Dental care is offered in the form of a dentist who visits the town twice a year. Qaanaaq Hospital falls under the Avannaa health region.

A small local fire brigade is assisted by firefighters from the Thule Air Base.

Government
The town is part of the region of Avannaata, which is represented by a 17-member council and mayor.

CTBTO Station 
Qaanaaq is home to a remote CTBTO infrasound listening station called IS-18, which uses an array of barometric sensors to detect possible nuclear tests around the world. The station is maintained by the Danish Meteorological Institute, and as of 2016 the current operator is Svend Erik Ascanius.

Population 
With 646 inhabitants as of 2020, Qaanaaq is the largest settlement in the far north of the country. Its population has been relatively stable with only minor fluctuations since the mid-1990s.

The city, with its relatively low population and tradition of hunting, currently has more huskies than human residents.

Climate

Qaanaaq has a cold tundra climate (Köppen climate classification ET), and hence it has long, cold winters. Peak temperatures occur in July and seldom exceed .

References

Further reading

 Murray, Louise. 2006. "On Thin Ice – Louise Murray Travels to Qaanaaq in Northern Greenland to See the Effect That Climate Change Is Having on Subsistence Hunters and Their Prey". Geographical : the Royal Geographical Society Magazine. 32.
 Remie, C. H. W. Facing the Future Inughuit Youth of Qaanaaq : Report of the 1998 University of Nijmegen Student Expedition to Qaanaaq, Thule District, Northern Greenland. Nijmegen: Nijmegen University Press, 1999.

External links

 http://qaasuitsup-kp.cowi.webhouse.dk/en/plans_for_towns_and_settlements/qaanaaq/
 Page with information on Qaanaaq and surroundings
 The Most Northern Place - A transmedia webdoc about the untold story of Thule 

Populated places in Greenland
Populated places established in the 1950s
Populated places of Arctic Greenland
1950s establishments in Greenland